List of aircraft in use by Turkey during World War II.  This shows how the Turkish Air Force would have been equipped throughout World War II as it was caught between the warring factions.

Fighters 

 PZL P.24
 Hawker Hurricane- Both before and during the war.
 Morane-Saulnier M.S.406- Sold just before the Battle of France.
 Supermarine Spitfire- Some in service in WWII. Mainly used Post-War.
 Curtiss P-40 Warhawk- Provided in 1943 in exchange for chromium and iron. Turkey like other neutral countries such as Spain and Sweden provided Germany with materials during World War II mainly chromium.

Bombers 

 Martin B-10
 Heinkel He 111
 Fairey Battle
 Bristol Blenheim* Consolidated B-24 Liberator- 5 out of 11 interned after Operation Tidal Wave in 1943 repaired and out into service. 
 Bristol Beaufort- Unlike those above was delivered during not before but during WWII from 1944-1945.Replaced Blenheim. 
 Martin Baltimore- Again acquired near end of WWII.

Trainers 

 Gotha Go 145
 Avro Anson- Its main role in RAF service was a trainer for bombers. Turkey most likely would have used it for this role. It could also use bombs so it could have been a bomber in Turkish service although far more likely a trainer considering they already had a lot of better bombers as seen here.

Army cooperation and liaison 

 Westland Lysander

See also
List of World War II weapons of Turkey

References

World War II Turkish aircraft
Aircraft
Turkey